John Harold Mitchell (31 January 1891 – 18 August 1962) was an Australian rules footballer who played with South Melbourne in the Victorian Football League (VFL).

Notes

External links 

1891 births
1962 deaths
Australian rules footballers from Melbourne
Sydney Swans players
People from Brunswick, Victoria